Bouïra (Kabyle: Tawilayt n Tuvirett) is a province (wilaya) in the Kabylie region (also known as Tazwawa)  in Algeria.

History
The province was created from parts of Médéa (département) and Tizi-Ouzou department in 1974.

Administrative divisions
It is made up of 12 districts and 45 communes or municipalities.

Districts

 Aïn Bessem
 Bechloul
 Bir Ghbalou
 Bordj Okhriss
 Bouïra
 El Hachimia
 Haïzer
 Kadiria
 Lakhdaria
 M'Chedellah
 Souk El Khemis
 Sour El Ghozlane

Communes

 Aïn Bessem
 Ahnif
 Aghbalou
 Aïn El Hadjar
 Ahl El Ksar
 Ain Laloui
 Ath Mansour Taourirt
 Aomar
 Aïn Turk (Ain el Turc)
 Ait Laziz
 Bouderbala
 Bechloul
 Bir Ghbalou
 Bouiche
 Boukram
 Bordj Okhriss
 Bouira
 Dechmia
 Dirrah
 Djebahia
 El Asnam
 El Hakimia
 El Hachimia
 El Adjiba
 El Khabouzia
 El Mokrani
 Guerrouma
 Haizer
 Hadjera Zerga
 Kadiria
 Lakhdaria
 M'Chedallah
 Mezdour
 Maala
 Maamora
 Oued El Berdi
 Ouled Rached
 Raouraoua
 Ridane
 Saharidj
 Sour El Ghouzlane
 Souk El Khemis
 Taguedit
 Taghzout
 Zbarbar

Notable people
Mohamed Aïchaoui, journalist, militant and martyr

References

External links
 Official website

Kabylie
 
Provinces of Algeria
States and territories established in 1974